Goshen is a town in Utah County, Utah, United States. It is part of the Provo–Orem Metropolitan Statistical Area. The population was 921 at the 2010 census.

History
The first settlement at Goshen was made in 1857 by a colony of Mormon pioneers. The community was named after Goshen, Connecticut.

Geography
According to the United States Census Bureau, the town has a total area of 0.7 square mile (1.9 km), all land.

Climate
Large seasonal temperature differences typify this climatic region, with warm to hot (and often humid) summers and cold (sometimes severely cold) winters.  According to the Köppen Climate Classification system, Goshen has a humid continental climate, abbreviated "Dfb" on climate maps.

Demographics

At the 2000 census, there were 874 people, 272 households, and 214 families in the town. The population density was 1,213.6 people per square mile (468.7/km). There were 295 housing units at an average density of 409.6 per square mile (158.2/km).  The racial makeup of the town was 92.22% White, 0.57% Native American, 5.49% from other races, and 1.72% from two or more races. Hispanic or Latino of any race were 8.35%.

Of the 272 households, 48.2% had children under 18 living with them, 70.2% were married couples living together, 5.5% had a female householder with no husband present, and 21.0% were non-families. 19.1% of households were one person, and 9.2% were one person aged 65 or older. The average household size was 3.21, and the average family size was 3.73.

The age distribution was 38.7% under the age of 18, 10.1% from 18 to 24, 26.5% from 25 to 44, 16.8% from 45 to 64, and 7.9% 65 or older. The median age was 26 years. For every 100 females, there were 97.3 males. For every 100 females aged 18 and over, there were 99.3 males.

The median household income was $41,458, and the median family income was $45,855. Males had a median income of $31,750 versus $21,771 for females. The per capita income for the town was $12,053. About 7.5% of families and 13.9% of the population were below the poverty line, including 20.2% of those under age 18 and 6.6% of those aged 65 or over.

Culture
In 1998, the Lou Diamond Phillips film Bats shot a scene in Goshen. The same year, the James Belushi film Made Men also shot scenes in Goshen.

In 2017, The Church of Jesus Christ of Latter-day Saints filmed an adaptation of The Book of Mormon as a series known as The Book of Mormon Videos.

In October 2020, Dallas Jenkins began filming season 2 of The Chosen inside a set owned by The Church of Jesus Christ of Latter-day Saints that replicates a section of old Jerusalem.

Notable person
Kent Peterson, left-handed pitcher for the Cincinnati Reds and Philadelphia Phillies

See also
 Tintic Standard Reduction Mill

References

External links

 
Towns in Utah
Provo–Orem metropolitan area
Populated places established in 1857
1857 establishments in Utah Territory
Towns in Utah County, Utah